Thomas A. Hanna (October 2, 1926 – April 26, 2019) was an American politician who served in the New York State Assembly from the 130th district from 1973 to 1984.

He died on April 26, 2019, in Webster, New York, at age 92.

References

1926 births
2019 deaths
Republican Party members of the New York State Assembly